The 2011–12 Welsh Football League Division Two began on 13 August 2011 and ended on 12 May 2012.

Team changes from 2010–11
AFC Porth, Cwmaman Institute and Ton Pentre were promoted to the Welsh Football League Division One.

Caldicot Town, Garden Village, Penrhiwceiber Rangers were relegated from the Welsh Football League Division One.

AFC Llwydcoed, Abertillery Bluebirds and Llangeinor were relegated to the Welsh Football League Division Three.

Caerau, Monmouth Town and Tata Steel were promoted from the Welsh Football League Division Three.

League table

Results

References

External links
 Welsh Football League

Welsh Football League Division Two seasons
3
Wales